Volodymyr Polovets is a former Soviet communist official and Ukrainian historian. He is a Doctor of Historical Sciences and a professor of the Chernihiv Collegium. He claims to be of Cuman descent.

Biography
Polovets was born in an old Ruthenian (Ukrainian) village of Vepryk (Bobrovytsia Raion, Chernihiv Oblast) on 2 January 1937. In 1958 he graduated the history and philosophy faculty of the Nizhyn Gogol State University. In 1972 Polovets successfully defended his graduate thesis titled as "Development of economical cooperation of Union republics during years of the first five-year plan".

Bibliography

Dissertations
 Development of economical cooperation of Union republics during years of the first five-year plan (Розвиток економічного співробітництва союзних республік в роки першої п'ятирічки, 1972)
 Cooperation movement in the Left-Bank Ukraine (1861—1917) (Кооперативний рух в Лівобережній Україні (1861—1917), 1997)

Monographs
 History of Ukraine, beginning course (Історія України, навчальна програма; 1999)
 Ukrainian Studies, beginning course (Українознавство, навчальна програма; 1999)
 History of Slavic people, lecturing course (Історія слов'ян, курс лекцій; 2000)
 Ukrainian Studies, lecturing course (Українознавство, курс лекцій; 2006)
 Fedir Mykhailovych Umanets (1841—1917) (Уманець Федір Михайлович (1841—1917 рр.); 2006)
 Polovets, V.M. Cumans (Половці). "Prosvita". Chernihiv, 2007. 136 pages. 
 History of Sociology (Історія соціології; 2014), along with Vitaliy Holets

External links
 Department of Ukrainian Studies, Political and Social Sciences at the Chernihiv Collegium
 Polovets wrote about Polovtsi (Половець написав про половців). Vysokyi Val. 21 March 2007

1937 births
Living people
People from Chernihiv Oblast
People of Cuman descent
20th-century Ukrainian historians
Academic staff of Nizhyn Gogol State University
21st-century Ukrainian historians